Le Retail is a commune in the Deux-Sèvres department in western France.

It is situated some 7 km south of Secondigny, 20 km southwest of Parthenay and 33 km north of Niort.

See also
Communes of the Deux-Sèvres department

References

Communes of Deux-Sèvres